Urlătoarea Mare River may refer to:
 Urlătoarea Mare, a tributary of the Buzău in Brașov County, Romania
 Urlătoarea Mare, a tributary of the Urlătoarea in Prahova County, Romania

See also 
 Urlătoarea River (disambiguation)